Zahng Gil-jah (pronounced , also romanized as Chang Gil-jah, see infobox) is a South Korean woman believed to be “God the Mother” (어머니 하나님) within the World Mission Society Church of God.

In the World Mission Society Church of God 
The World Mission Society Church of God, a Korean new religious movement, teaches that Zahng and Ahn Sahng-Hong (1918–1985; a South Korean Christian minister regarded as Christ) are to be jointly regarded as God. She is testified by Mr. Ahnsahnghong in his Last Passover in 1984 as Heavenly Mother. Church members may call her "God the Mother", "Mother Jerusalem", "New Jerusalem Mother", or "Heavenly Mother". She is believed to have fulfilled all prophecies of the Bible.

Other activities 
In addition to her status in the World Mission Society Church of God, Zahng is the chairperson of the International WeLoveU Foundation (국제위러브유 운동), which changed its name from New Life Welfare Foundation (새생명복지회) in 2007.

Zahng is the recipient of various recognitions for her philanthropy. Her recognitions include the Maengho Medal (the Order of Sport Merit) from the Korean government, the President's Call to Service Award, the Royal Order of Monisaraphon from the Cambodian government, the Great Woman Award from the Minister of Women & Social Development of Peru, and an Atlanta City Council Proclamation.

See also 
 God the Father
 Mother goddess

References 

South Korean Christian religious leaders
Deified Korean people
Deified women
1943 births
Living people
Members of the Royal Order of Monisaraphon